Raif, Raaif, sometimes Raef (Arabic: رَائِف rā’if) is an Arabic male given name or used as a surname meaning "kind, compassionate, affectionate, benign" or "sympathetic, merciful". 

The name comes from the Arabic verb ra’afa (رَأَفَ) "to have compassion for, have mercy upon, be merciful toward" and stems from the noun ra’ūf or rawūf (رَؤُوفَ) which is also used as the male given name Rauf. Other written variants are Ra'ef, Rayif or Raefe. Notable people with the name include:

Given name
Raif Badawi (born 1984), Saudi writer, dissident and activist
Raif Denktaş (1951–1985), Turkish Cypriot composer, politician, academic, journalist and writer
Raif Dizdarević (born 1926), Bosnian politician
Raif Husić (born 1996), German footballer
Raif Khoury (1913–1967), Lebanese writer
Raif Muradov (born 1993), Bulgarian footballer

Surname
Samira Raif (born 1974), Moroccan long-distance runner

See also
Rafe (name)

Turkish masculine given names